The Riptides are a Canadian punk rock band formed in 1998 in Ottawa, Ontario.

History
The Riptides were formed in Ottawa, Ontario Canada in February 1998. The original lineup included Andy Vandal (vocals) Bob Goblin (bass), Johnny Dangerously (drums), and Steve Ransom (guitar) and the band released the cassette-only Harelip record. Later that year, Dangerously and Ransom left the country to travel abroad and were replaced by Doug Vermin (guitar) and Sean Shameless (drums). This lineup would remain consistent until 2005.

From 1999 to 2001, the band recorded and released several independent records off of their own imprint Goblin Records. In October, 2001 the band recorded Drop Out at the Electric Cave in Portsmouth, N.H. The recording was engineered by Jim Tierney and produced by Joe Queer who provided lead vocals for two of the songs, "I'm Lobotomized 'Cause of You" and "Surfers Are Back". The record was released in 2002.

From 2002 to 2005, the band toured throughout Canada and the U.S. with bands like The Queers, The Dwarves, The Methadones, Moral Crux and The Vapids. The band's label (Goblin) set up a recording studio in downtown Ottawa called The Shooting Gallery and recorded many local punk rock bands including The Vapids, The Creeps, Dying Riot, The Sewer Rats, The Jollys, Uninspired Empire, Sack Lunch, Sexhead and The PG-13s. Multiple full-length albums, split EPs and compilations including the Kick 'Em While They're Down series resulted.

In 2006, the band signed Union Label Group (Canada), for the release of the record Hang Out. The album was recorded by Mass Giorgini, and again featured guest vocals by Joe Queer for the song "China Doll". The record featured drummer Pat Bitch formerly of The PG-13s, and guitarist Skottie Lobotomy of The Creeps.

In 2008, the band recorded an all instrumental EP titled Mental Therapy (Rally Records). It was engineered by Luke Copyright and was their first release to feature new drummer Dan Lumley. The EP produced the song "Return to Blood Beach" which was featured in the video game Skate 2.

In 2009, the band signed to Asian Man Records and in May 2009, recorded the full-length Tales from Planet Earth. It was again produced by Mass Giorgini. and engineered by Phil Hill (Teen Idols) at Sonic Iguana Studios in Lafayette, IN. Tales was released on October 13, 2009. Additional songs recorded during the Tales session were compiled and released in January 2010 on the limited vinyl-only EP titled Tough Luck.

The band embarked on a month-long U.S. tour in the fall of 2010 with Asian Man label-mates The Queers and Kepi Ghoulie. The lineup featured Adam Woronoff of The Leftovers on drums and Corey Weirdo of The Varsity Weirdos on rhythm guitar.

In May 2011, the band returned to Sonic Iguana Studios in Lafayette, IN with Mass Giorgini mixing and mastering. The resulting songs were released on several split EPs with bands such as The Dwarves, The Queers, The Apers and The Connection.

Discography

Studio albums
 I'm in Love with a Harelip Retard (1998) (Goblin)
 Going Downsyndrome (1999) (Goblin)
 California Reamin (2000) (Goblin)
 Appetite for Rejection (2000) (Goblin)
 Drop Out (2002) (Goblin)
 Hang Out (2006) (Union Label Group)
 Tales from Planet Earth (2009) (Asian Man)
 Canadian Graffiti (2017)

EPs
 Mental Therapy (2008) (Rally Records)
 Tough Luck (2010) (Rally Records)

Splits
 Split w/ The Vapids (2003) (Goblin)
 Buy It You Scum (Split w/ The Queers) (2011) (Asian Man)
 Stillborn in the U.S.A. (Split w/ The Dwarves) (2011) (Asian Man)
 What About the Monster? (Split w/ The Apers) (2013) (Asian Man)
 Surf Nazis Must Die (Split w/ The Connection) (2014) (Asian Man)

References

Musical groups established in 1998
Musical groups from Ottawa
Canadian punk rock groups
Asian Man Records artists
1998 establishments in Ontario